Narasak Ittiritpong (born 30 July 1983) is a Thai racing driver currently competing in the TCR International Series and TCR Thailand Touring Car Championship. Having previously competed in the Thailand Super Series, Thai Rally Championship  and Thai Honda Civic Racing Festival amongst others.

Racing career
Ittiritpong began his career in 1997 in the Thai Rally Championship, he raced there until 1999, winning the title in 1998. He also raced in the Thai Rallycross Championship in this period and won the title in 1998 and 1999. In 2000 he made his circuit racing debut in the Thai GT Championship, finishing second in the championship standing in 2000 and 2001. He returned to rallying in 2003, again choosing the Thai Rally Championship, finishing second in the standings that year and winning the title the next year. After a 2-year hiatus he returned to rallying in 2007, going on to win the title that year. In 2008 he returned to circuit racing in the Thai Honda Civic Racing Festival, winning the Class B title that year, continuing in the series the three following years, he won the Class A title all three times. He also raced in the Thailand Super Series in 2010, finishing second in the S2000 class, he had a couple further appearances in the series in 2013 and 2014. Before returning full-time in 2016 in the GTC class, where he currently leads the standings. In 2015 he raced in the Thai Honda Jazz Super Cup. For 2016 he switched to the all new 2016 TCR Thailand Touring Car Championship, where he also took part in the 2016 TCR Asia Series round held in Thailand.

In August 2016 it was announced that he would race in the TCR International Series, driving a Honda Civic TCR for Vattana Motorsport.

Racing record

Complete TCR International Series results
(key) (Races in bold indicate pole position) (Races in italics indicate fastest lap)

References

External links
 
 

1983 births
Living people
TCR Asia Series drivers
TCR International Series drivers
Narasak Ittiritpong
Narasak Ittiritpong